The 2013–14 EUHL season was the first season of European University Hockey League featuring five teams from Slovakia and the Czech Republic.

Regular season
The regular season will be played in a conventional one home-one away round-robin schedule. The best four teams will advance to Play-off.

Table

Matches

Source:

Play-offs

Exhibition game

On January 5, 2014 the EUHL all-star team played in an exhibition game against American Collegiate Hockey Association Division 2 all-stars team in Ondrej Nepela Arena in Bratislava, Slovakia.

References

2013–14 in Czech ice hockey leagues
2013–14 in Slovak ice hockey leagues